Ficus ficus or the paper fig shell is a species of sea snail, a marine gastropod mollusk in the family Ficidae, the fig shells.

Distribution
Ficus ficus is found in the Indian Ocean and the West Pacific.

Description
Ficus ficus is an unusual shaped thin shell being somewhat pear-shaped with a long narrow aperture and four whorls. The spire is tiny. The shell may reach 5 ins (12 cm) in length. The maximum recorded shell length is 145 mm. There is a trellis-like sculpture of fine striations on the pinkish surface. The inside is orange and there is no operculum. There is a large foot with two curved flaps near the head and a single long siphon.

Habitat 
The minimum recorded depth for this species is 0 m.; maximum recorded depth is 176 m.

References

External links

Ficidae
Gastropods described in 1758
Taxa named by Carl Linnaeus